Linkletter is a rural municipality in Prince Edward Island, Canada. It is located in Prince County.

The community is named after settler George Linkletter, who arrived from Greenwich, Connecticut in 1783 after receiving a royal land grant. His son George Linkletter II would have his estate as the namesake of the community of Summerside. When George Linkletter settled on Prince Edward Island, he and his family also began Linkletter farms which still operates as a potato farm today. Although George Linkletter began the farm in 1783 after settling, it was not till the 1940s before they specialized in potato farming.

Demographics 

See also

 Linkletter Provincial Park

References 

Communities in Prince County, Prince Edward Island
Rural municipalities in Prince Edward Island